Märcaniä was a madrasa in Kazan attached to the Märcani Mosque.

Brief history 
It was created around 1770 and had many (often coexisting) names, including The First Cathedral Mosque's madrasa and Yunısof's madrasa.  Later, it acquired the name Märcaniä, in honour of Şihabetdin Märcani, who was madrasa's mudarris between 1850 and 1889, during whose leadership the madrasa became a major center of Muslim education in the area; apart from religious subjects, mathematics, astronomy and history and other non-religious subjects were taught.

In 1918, the madrasah was officially closed, but Märcani Mosque's imam Safiulla Abdullin continued to secretly teach shakirds until 1923.

Famous students 
Märcaniä was an alma mater for Xösäyen Yamaşef, Salix Säydäş, Xösäyen Fäyezxanof, Ğäbdelğälläm Fäyezxanof, Ğabdraxman Ğömäri, Sitdıyq Aydarof, Käşşaf Tärcemani, Ğabdulla Apanayef, Morat Rämzi and others.

References

External links
 

19th-century madrasas
20th-century madrasas
Madrasas in the Russian Empire
Cultural heritage monuments of regional significance in Tatarstan
Religious buildings and structures in Kazan